Christian Bjelland may refer to:

Christian Bjelland I (1858–1927), Norwegian businessman
Christian Bjelland IV (born 1954), Norwegian industrialist and art collector

See also
Bjelland (surname)